The Alpine Biogeographic Region is a biogeographic region, as defined by the European Environment Agency, that covers the mountainous regions of Europe.

Extent

The Alpine biogeographic region of Europe includes the Alps in France, Italy, Germany, Austria, Slovenia, Switzerland and Monaco, the Apennines in Italy, the Pyrenees between Spain and France, the Scandes in Sweden, Finland and Norway and the Carpathians in Slovakia, Poland, Romania and the Ukraine.
The region also includes the Dinaric Alps, Balkans, Rhodopes, Urals and Caucasia.

Environment

All the ranges in the Alpine region have high altitude, rugged terrain and a relatively cold and harsh climate.
The mountains all have the same zones of vegetation, but further north the low temperature zones are found lower down.
On the lower slopes there are forests and grasslands.
Higher up the montane grasslands give way to scrub heath and then to a few very hardy plants adapted to the rocks and snow of the highest altitudes.
The complex topography creates many different microclimates.
The Alpine region has about two thirds of the plants found in Europe, including endemic plants at the higher levels with very limited distribution.

Notes

Sources

Environment of Europe
Biogeography